Kseniya Sadouskaya (born 17 March 1991) is a Belarusian speed skater. She competed in the women's 500 metres at the 2018 Winter Olympics.

Records

Personal records

References

1991 births
Living people
Belarusian female speed skaters
Olympic speed skaters of Belarus
Speed skaters at the 2018 Winter Olympics
Place of birth missing (living people)